Angels Never Die is the fourth solo album of the German female hard rock singer Doro Pesch. The album was released in February 1993 and was produced by Jack Ponti and Vic Pepe. The two producers had worked with Alice Cooper on the hit single "Hey Stoopid" and had produced minor glam metal bands like Surgin' and Baton Rouge. The sound and musical style of Angels Never Die is very similar to what can be heard on the second Doro solo album, alternating heavy rock tracks with large choruses and power ballads, in the vein of the declining glam metal that had dominated the American rock charts for the first part of the decade.

The album was not published in the US and had limited success in Europe. However, the video for the song "Bad Blood" was voted best anti-racism video during the first MTV Europe Music Awards ceremony in 1994.

Angels Never Die remained on the German Longplay chart for 13 weeks, peaking at position No. 21.

Track listing
All credits adapted from the original release.

Personnel
Musicians
 Doro Pesch – vocals, arrangements
 Jack Ponti – electric guitar, bass, keyboards, producer, arrangements, mixing, backing vocals
 Vic Pepe – acoustic guitar, electric guitar, producer, arrangements
 Ryan Roxie – electric guitar
 Harold Frazee – keyboards, piano, backing vocals
 Nick Douglas, Matt Nelson, Brian Perry – bass
 Joey Franco – drums, percussion

Guests
 Eric Gales – guitar solo on "Heaven with You", "Born to Bleed" and "Bad Blood"
 Eugene Gales – guitar solo on "Last Day of My Life" and "Don't Go"

Production
 Jon Mathias – engineer, mixing
 Garth Micheal, Barry Steiman – assistant engineers
 George Marino – mastering

References

External links
 American site
 "Last Day of My Life" video clip
 "Bad Blood" video clip

Doro (musician) albums
1993 albums
Vertigo Records albums